This article contains a list of fossil-bearing stratigraphic units in Washington D.C., U.S.

Sites

See also

 Paleontology in Washington, D.C.

References

 

Washington D.C.
Stratigraphic units
Geology of Washington, D.C.
Washington, D.C.-related lists